was a Japanese singer-songwriter.

Hashida was a Kyoto native and attended Doshisha University. He was invited to join The Folk Crusaders in 1967 and appeared with the band in the 1968 film Three Resurrected Drunkards before the group split. Hashida then led  until 1970. The song "Hanayome" performed by Norihiko Hashida and Climax reached number 1 on the Oricon Weekly Singles Chart from 15 February to 28 February 1971. Hashida died of Parkinson's disease aged 72, at a hospital in Kyoto.

References

External links

1945 births
2017 deaths
Japanese singer-songwriters
Musicians from Kyoto
Doshisha University alumni
Neurological disease deaths in Japan
Deaths from Parkinson's disease
The Folk Crusaders members